The red-rumped cacique (Cacicus haemorrhous) is a species of bird in the family Icteridae. It is a species of the Amazon Basin and the Guyanas in northern South America, and is only coastal there in the Guyanas and the Amazon River outlet to the Atlantic; a separate large disjunct range exists in all of south-eastern and coastal Brazil, including Paraguay, and parts of north-eastern Argentina. It is also found in Bolivia, Brazil, Colombia, Ecuador, French Guiana, Guyana, Peru, Suriname, and Venezuela.

The red-rumped cacique's natural habitats are subtropical or tropical moist lowland forests, subtropical or tropical swamps, and heavily degraded former forest.

In 1760 the French zoologist Mathurin Jacques Brisson included a description of the red-rumped cacique in his Ornithologie based on a specimen collected in Cayenne in French Guiana. He used the French name Le cassique rouge and the Latin name Cassicus ruber. Although Brisson coined Latin names, these do not conform to the binomial system and are not recognised by the International Commission on Zoological Nomenclature. When in 1766 the Swedish naturalist Carl Linnaeus updated his Systema Naturae for the twelfth edition, he added 240 species that had been previously described by Brisson. One of these was the red-rumped cacique. Linnaeus included a brief description, coined the binomial name Oriolus haemorrhous and cited Brisson's work. The specific name haemorrhous combines the Ancient Greek words haima "blood" and orrhos "rump". The red-rumped cacique is now the type species in the genus Cacicus that introduced by the French naturalist Bernard Germain de Lacépède in 1799.

References

External links

Red-rumped cacique videos - Internet Bird Collection
Stamps (for Suriname) with range map – (shows disjunct range on south-east coastal Brazil)
Red-rumped cacique photo gallery - VIREO Photo-High Res
Photo; Article-(High Res: photo gallery: Nest, preening, Surinam map, etc.) - https://www.nhlstenden.com/

red-rumped cacique
Birds of Brazil
Birds of the Amazon Basin
Birds of the Guianas
Birds of Paraguay
red-rumped cacique
red-rumped cacique
Taxonomy articles created by Polbot